Mischief is a 1985 American comedy film starring Doug McKeon, Chris Nash, Catherine Mary Stewart and Kelly Preston. The film was directed by Mel Damski and written by Noel Black. The original music score was composed by Barry De Vorzon.

Set in Nelsonville, Ohio, in 1956, its soundtrack features many popular songs from the era.

Plot
In Nelsonville, Ohio in 1956, nonconformist, extroverted Eugene "Gene" Harbrough moves from Chicago to next door to the introverted, clumsy Jonathan Bellah. They soon develop a friendship, with Gene deciding to take him under his wing and teach him how to attract women. 

Jonathan's main objective is to win over the sexy Marilyn McCauley, in spite of his shyness. Gene proclaims that he can groom him to win her over in a month. 

Gene has his own love life to maintain with his crush, Bunny Miller, who reciprocates his feelings. He also has to defend Jonathan and himself from the wealthy class bully, Kenny, Bunny's jealous jock boyfriend.

After a confrontation at the drive-in, Kenny challenges Gene to a game with their cars, center line chicken. Neither backs down in time, so both cars are damaged. Gene's father hits him for damaging the car and grounds him. This shows the dysfunctional relationship he has with his widowed father, who has zero tolerance for Gene's often wild escapades.

Jonathan gives Gene much needed support and friendship. And likewise Gene helps him with his self-esteem. Marilyn agrees to go out with Jonathan and they get very involved. At the same time, Gene and Bunny progress with he talking about his future dream to own a horse stable. 

After an evening scuffle at the local diner instigated by the pompous Kenny that results in some damage to the premises, Gene's father kicks him out. Gone for weeks, he reappears on the night of the prom. Hunting down Jonathan, they go to the prom without tuxes. Marilyn has gone with her ex, a quarterback she dated the previous year, Bunny is there with Kenny.

The guys take off, with Bunny trying to chase after Gene. A bit outside of town they stop and catch up. Gene has relocated to Kentucky, where he has gotten work in a stable. He's come back for Bunny, but now thinks she won't go with him. Jonathan goes to find her, they reconcile, and take off for Kentucky on his motorcycle.

Back in town, Jonathan informs Bunny's family that she's gone, stands up to Kenny by totaling his car and finally asks out Rosalie, who no longer has braces or glasses

Cast

 Doug McKeon as Jonathan Bellah
 Chris Nash as Eugene "Gene" Harbrough
 Catherine Mary Stewart as Bunny Miller
 Kelly Preston as Marilyn McCauley
 D.W. Brown as Kenny Brubaker
 Jami Gertz as Rosalie Hewitt
 Margaret Blye as Claire Miller
 Graham Jarvis as Mr. Miller
 Terry O'Quinn as Claude Harbrough

Production
Doug McKeon later called the film the most enjoyable he worked on. He said this was because "I turned 18 during the making of the film, and thus I was an “adult” for the first time in my career and didn't need a guardian with me anymore. Moreover, all the actors on that film (Chris Nash, Kelly Preston, Catherine Mary Stewart, and Jami Gertz) were so much fun to be around. Furthermore, the film took place in the 1950s, and driving the old cars, listening to that era's music, wearing the clothes, etc. It was really enjoyable."

Reception
On Rotten Tomatoes the film has an approval rating of 57% based on reviews from 7 critics.

The Boston Globe said the film "falls out somewhere in the middle of the nostalgia pile. It's not as bad as the worst, not as good as the best. It's likable, but it's stolen by its props. They're more specific than the characters, starting with the locale. The filmmakers were lucky to find the real-life town of Nelsonville, Ohio, for their look back at high school life in 1956. "

The Los Angeles Times said, "Neither terrible nor outstanding, it's the kind of middle-of-the-road picture that's hard to remember a week after seeing it. "

The New York Times said "if Norman Rockwell had wanted to make Porky's he might have come up with something like Mischief a small-town fable about a sex-obsessed teenager. With its summery settings, pretty costumes and pastel hues, Mischief is nostalgic and then some; it has the quality of something remembered in especially flattering light."

References

External links
 
 

1985 films
1985 romantic comedy films
American coming-of-age films
Comedy-drama
Romantic period films
Films about virginity
Films set in 1956
American teen comedy films
Films set in Ohio
20th Century Fox films
American sex comedy films
1980s English-language films
Films directed by Mel Damski
Films scored by Barry De Vorzon
1980s sex comedy films
Teen sex comedy films
1980s American films